The Leader of the Senate of Northern Ireland was the Leader of the House in the Senate of Northern Ireland.  The post was a cabinet position that was nevertheless politically unimportant.  In his memoirs, Brian Faulkner expresses surprise that Jack Andrews accepted the position, as he saw it as a demotion.

The Deputy Leader of the Senate of Northern Ireland was the third-ranking position in the Senate, after the Leader and the Speaker.  The position of Deputy Leader was established, along with the Senate itself, in 1921, and the position was abolished in 1961.

List of leaders

List of deputy leaders

See also
 Speaker of the Senate of Northern Ireland

References
Members of the Northern Ireland Senate, 1921-1972

Senate of Northern Ireland